Matt Beca (born March 6, 1986) is a retired Canadian professional ice hockey player. He last played for Glasgow Clan of the EIHL, where he was player/assistant coach. He previously played for fellow Elite League side Manchester Storm and Rote Teufel Bad Nauheim of the DEL2.

Playing career
Prior to turning professional, Beca attended Clarkson University, where he played four seasons of college hockey with the NCAA Division I Clarkson Golden Knights men's ice hockey team. Beca was a freshman with the Golden Knights when they won the 2006-07 ECAC conference tournament, and he was named as the team's most valuable player, winning the Bill Harrison MVP Award, during his senior year.

During the 2012–13 season, Beca compiled 23 points in 31 games for the Everblades before he was reassigned by the Checkers as part of a trade for Matthew Pistilli to the South Carolina Stingrays on December 31, 2012.

After four seasons of professional hockey in North America, Beca left to sign his first European contract with German club, Rote Teufel Bad Nauheim of the DEL2 on July 28, 2013.

Ahead of the 2016/17 season, Beca signed for Braehead Clan of the UK's EIHL, putting up 83 points in 62 league and cup games. On 14 July 2017, Beca followed former Braehead coach Ryan Finnerty to sign for Manchester Storm. In doing so, Beca re-joined former Braehead teammates Jay Rosehill and Mike Hammond who had both signed for the club earlier in the summer.

Beca rejoined the newly renamed Glasgow Clan ahead of the 2018-19 season, spending a further two campaigns with the team before retirement.

Career statistics

Awards and honours

References

External links

1986 births
Living people
Braehead Clan players
Canadian ice hockey forwards
Charlotte Checkers (2010–) players
Clarkson Golden Knights men's ice hockey players
Florida Everblades players
Glasgow Clan players
Ice hockey people from Ontario
South Carolina Stingrays players
Sportspeople from Mississauga
Springfield Falcons players
Manchester Storm (2015–) players
Canadian expatriate ice hockey players in England
Canadian expatriate ice hockey players in Scotland
Canadian expatriate ice hockey players in the United States
Canadian expatriate ice hockey players in Slovakia
Canadian expatriate ice hockey players in Germany
Canadian expatriate ice hockey players in Italy